The American Pediatric Surgical Association is an American professional organization dedicated to pediatric surgery. It was established in 1970 and had over 1,200 members as of 2015. Its official journal is the Journal of Pediatric Surgery.

References

External links

Surgical organizations based in the United States
Medical and health organizations based in Illinois
1970 establishments in Illinois
Organizations established in 1970
Pediatric organizations
Pediatric surgery